Duders Beach or Umupuia Beach (the official name) is located in Manukau City, New Zealand, to the east of Maraetai on the North Road from Clevedon. Duder Regional Park is on the headland immediately to the east.

The land was purchased in 1866 from the original Maori owners Ngāi Tai by Thomas Duder.  Today the beach is divided between the "public beach" and a private beach owned above the high tide mark by his descendants.

Duders Beach has traditionally been a good source of seafood, notably shellfish, but stocks have been depleted in recent times.

References 

Beaches of the Auckland Region
Populated places in the Auckland Region
Ngāi Tai ki Tāmaki
Populated places around the Hauraki Gulf / Tīkapa Moana